Illinois Route 9 (IL 9) is a  cross-state, east–west rural state highway in the central part of the U.S. state of Illinois. It travels from Niota at the Fort Madison Toll Bridge, that crosses the Mississippi River into Iowa, eastward across central Illinois to State Road 26 (SR 26) at the Indiana state line.

Route description

IL 9 is a major arterial route in rural central Illinois. It is a parallel highway to IL 116 to the north and U.S. Route 136 (US 136) to its south. It is a two-lane highway for most of its length.

Illinois Route 9 runs eastward from the Mississippi River at the Fort Madison Toll Bridge to the Indiana state line near Cheneyville at SR 26 and SR 352. It crosses the Illinois River on the John T. McNaughton Bridge at Pekin, where it becomes known as Court Street in the city. It has an interchange with I-155 at Tremont; I-55/I-74 at Bloomington; and Interstate 57 (I-57) at Paxton.

History
IL 9 was established in 1918 as one of the original 46 State Bond Issue Route (SBI) routes.
The routing of IL 9 has had two major changes since its establishment.

 US 136, Hamilton to New Philadelphia,
 IL 41, New Philadelphia to Bushnell
 IL 9, Bushnell to Indiana state line.

This current highway moved north to terminate in Niota at the Fort Madison Toll Bridge (longest double-deck swing-span bridge in the world) after its completion in July 1928. The route parallels the Atchison, Topeka and Santa Fe Railway and Mississippi River to Dallas City then turns slightly southeast to LaHarpe. From LaHarpe, the highway parallels the original Toledo, Peoria and Western Railway right-of way to Bushnell.

From 1935 to 1937, IL 9 traveled a different route from Pekin to Bloomington, that original route is now posted as:

 IL 29, Pekin to North Pekin,
 IL 98, North Pekin to Morton,
 US 150, Morton to Bloomington.

Future
Between Macomb and Peoria, the next section of IL 336 is being studied Portions of IL 9 are being considered for the IL 336 project from Peoria to Macomb.

Major intersections

See also

References

External links

 Illinois Highway Ends: Illinois Route 9

009
Transportation in McDonough County, Illinois
Transportation in Fulton County, Illinois
Transportation in Peoria County, Illinois
Transportation in Tazewell County, Illinois
Transportation in McLean County, Illinois
Transportation in Ford County, Illinois
Transportation in Vermilion County, Illinois
Bloomington–Normal
Transportation in Hancock County, Illinois